Bajgan Rural District is a rural district (dehestan) in Aseminun District, Manujan County, Kerman Province, Iran. At the 2006 census, its population was 6,545, in 1,465 families. The rural district has 13 villages.

References 

Rural Districts of Kerman Province
Manujan County